Walter W. Preston (died July 12, 1951) was an American politician and judge from Maryland. He served as a member of the Maryland House of Delegates, representing Harford County from 1888 to 1892.

Early life
Walter W. Preston was born to Mary A. (née Wilks) and James B. Preston. His father was a member of the Maryland House of Delegates He graduated from Princeton University in 1881 and graduated with a law degree from the University of Maryland School of Law in 1883. He was admitted to the bar in 1883. He was the brother of Baltimore mayor James H. Preston.

Career
Preston was a Democrat. He served as a member of the Maryland House of Delegates, representing Harford County from 1888 to 1892. He served as chair of the judiciary committee.

Preston served as state's attorney in Harford County in 1901 and served two other terms. In 1920, Preston was appointed by Governor Albert Ritchie to succeed Judge McClean as judge of the Third Judicial Court. He served there for six years. He later became judge of the Circuit Court of Harford County after the retirement of Judge William M. Harlan.

Preston wrote The History of Harford County. In 1900, Preston organized the Savings Bank of Harford County (later the Commercial and Savings Bank of Bel Air). He retired in January 1949 as chairman of the board.

Personal life
Preston married Mary Pue. She was president-general of the Maryland branch of the United Daughters of the Confederacy. They had no children. She died in 1937. Preston was a vestryman at St. Mary's Episcopal Church.

Preston died on July 12, 1951, at the age of 88, at his home in Emmorton. He was buried at St. Mary's Episcopal Church in Emmorton.

References

Year of birth uncertain
1860s births
1951 deaths
People from Harford County, Maryland
Princeton University alumni
University of Maryland Francis King Carey School of Law alumni
Democratic Party members of the Maryland House of Delegates
State's attorneys in Maryland
Maryland state court judges